Scilla siberica, the Siberian squill or wood squill, is a species of flowering plant in the family Asparagaceae, native to southwestern Russia, the Caucasus, and Turkey. Despite its name, it is not native to Siberia.

Description

The flowers have six tepals and six stamens, and are arranged singly or in racemes of two or three. Petals may be reflexed to the horizontal when sunlight is bright, but are more often cup-shaped. The flowers are usually blue, but those of Scilla siberica var. alba are white. The stamens of Scilla are separate, unlike those of the related genus Puschkinia, which are fused into a tube. The pollen is dark blue.

After flowering, the flower stems become limp as capsules (pods) mature. At maturity, the capsules become purple and split open, releasing small, dark brown seeds. When the seeds are mature, the leaves wither and the plant goes dormant until the next spring.

The seedlings are hollow-leaved.

Cultivation
S. siberica is cultivated for its bluebell-like flowers. It naturalizes rapidly from seed. At , it is suitable for planting in grass, and will spread by seed to form large colonies that go dormant by the time grass needs to be mowed. In the Midwestern United States it is becoming invasive in some situations.

This plant has gained the Royal Horticultural Society's Award of Garden Merit.

Gallery

References

External links

 
 Pacific Bulb Society
 The Plant Expert

siberica
Ephemeral plants
Taxa named by Henry Cranke Andrews